Leonard Starr (October 28, 1925 – June 30, 2015) was an American cartoonist, comic book artist, and advertising artist, best known for creating the newspaper comic strip On Stage and reviving Little Orphan Annie.

Early life 
Born October 28, 1925, in New York City, Starr graduated from Manhattan's High School of Music and Art and then studied at Pratt Institute.

Career 
While attending Pratt during 1942–43, Starr worked for the Harry "A" Chesler and the Funnies, Inc. studios, contributing to the early comic book features produced at these studios. For Funnies, Inc., he began as a background artist, eventually inking Bob Oksner's pencils. He graduated to drawing for early Timely/Marvel Comics titles, including the Human Torch and the Sub-Mariner.

Throughout the 1940s, Starr worked for a plethora of publishers of both comic books and pulps, including Better Publications, Consolidated Book, Croyden Publications, E. R. Ross Publishing, Fawcett Comics (doing Don Winslow of the Navy, 1944–46), Hillman Periodicals and M. C. Combs. He worked with Joe Simon and Jack Kirby on their earlier romance comics titles, in particular the Crestwood/Prize title Young Romance.

In the late 1940s, he drew for EC Comics, including War Against Crime, before working both as an advertising artist and producing a large amount of work for both the American Comics Group and DC Comics titles during the early to mid-1950s. His DC work spanned a large number of covers, and work on titles as diverse as Doctor 13, House of Mystery, Gang Busters, Pow-Wow Smith, Indian Lawman and Star-Spangled War Stories, mainly prior to 1957. For ACG, he worked on Adventures into the Unknown, Operation Peril and Soldiers of Fortune among other titles. In 1955–56, he moved from comic books to comic strips with uncredited work on King Features' Flash Gordon.

Mary Perkins, On Stage 
In 1957, Starr created the comic strip On Stage, later titled Mary Perkins, On Stage for the Chicago-Tribune-New York News Syndicate. Characterized by a mix of soap opera, adventure and humor, the strip featured tight, realistic graphics and, from the beginning, strong layouts, design and storytelling. He received the National Cartoonists Society's Story Comic Strip Award for On Stage in 1960 and 1963, and their Reuben Award in 1965. He continued producing Mary Perkins, On Stage until 1979. Starr would later cite the work of Alex Raymond and Milton Caniff as influences on the strip's artwork.

Other work 
Starr returned to comic books very briefly during the 1970s and 1980s, working on "Morbius, the Living Vampire" for Marvel in 1975 and providing art for DC's Who's Who in the DC Universe (1986) and for a Superman and Lois Lane story in Action Comics. For Dargaud in Paris, he created Kelly Green with Stan Drake in 1980. This series of graphic novels about the sexy and capable female action heroine Kelly Green, were illustrated by Drake. In 1985 he wrote and illustrated an action/adventure graphic novel published only in France Operation Psy featuring Cannonball Carmody. That same year he was enlisted by artist Frank Bolle to take over writing the strip Winnie Winkle (without credit) which he did until its end in 1996. He also ghost wrote Rip Kirby as a favor to his friend, artist John Prentice, in the strip's final years.

Starr expanded into animation in the 1980s, as he noted, "Started writing television scripts in the early 1970s, and in 1984 I was asked to develop and write the bible for the animated television show ThunderCats, and also act as the story editor and head writer. Moved to Westport, Connecticut in 1970 where I still live today." Starr eventually wrote 23 episodes for ThunderCats.

He also worked on the Rankin Bass series Ghost Warrior (1985).

In the 1980s Starr attended as a guest several comic conventions held in New York. Also, he was a guest at the 1982 San Diego Comic-Con, at which he received an Inkpot Award.

Little Orphan Annie 

In 1979 he revived the comic strip Little Orphan Annie. The strip had been in reprints since 1974 after a string of unsuccessful artists had succeeded the famous creator Harold Gray, who had died in 1968. Retitled Annie, Starr's incarnation of the strip received the National Cartoonists Society's Story Comic Strip Award in 1983 and 1984. Starr continued it successfully until his retirement in 2000.

Later life 
Beginning in 2006, Starr produced new artwork for the covers to the  ongoing series of On Stage reprint volumes published by Classic Comics Press. To publicize the reprints he was a guest at the 2008 New York Comic Con and 2009 San Diego Comic-Con. He died June 30, 2015.

Classic Comics Press has announced plans to publish Cannonball Carmody in English for the first time plus excerpts of sketchbooks from early in Starr's career.

Bibliography

ThunderCats 
 Exodus
 The Unholy Alliance
 Berbils
 The Slaves of Castle Plun-Darr
 The Tower of Traps
 The Ghost Warrior
 The Spaceship Beneath the Sands
 Lion-O's Anointment First Day: The Trial of Strength
 The Crystal Queen
 Lion-O's Anointment Second Day: The Trial of Speed
 Lion-O's Anointment Third Day: The Trial of Cunning
 Lion-O's Anointment Fourth Day: The Trial of Mind Power
 Lion-O's Anointment Final Day: The Trial of Evil
 ThunderCats Ho! Parts 1-5
 Mumm-Ra Lives! Parts 1-5

References

Further reading 
Amash, Jim (2012). Alter Ego Nos.110-113. In-depth four part interview with Starr on his career.
Cobb, David. "When it got to be moose-hunting time in the bar, Starr turned up On Stage". Toronto Telegram. December 9, 1967. p. 28
Crichton, David (2011). Hear the Roar!. Telos Publishing.

External links 
Leonard Starr official site
NCS Awards

 
 Leonard Starr cartoons: An inventory of his cartoons at Syracuse University
Hanging Out with Leonard Starr by John Lustig

1925 births
2015 deaths
American comic strip cartoonists
American comics artists
Chicago Tribune people
Reuben Award winners
The High School of Music & Art alumni
Pratt Institute alumni